The Unione Naziunale is a Corsican nationalist group of political parties seeking independence of Corsica from France. In the last regional elections, the movement won around 20% of the votes and formed a group in the Corsican Assembly.

See also
List of political parties in France
Corsican nationalism
Political parties in Corsica
Political party alliances in France
Pro-independence parties
Secessionist organizations in Europe